Nanben Da is a 2017 Indian Tamil language comedy chat show which airs on Zee Tamil every Sunday at 1:30PM (IST) from 18 June 2017 to 10 December 2017 for 27 Episodes. The show was shift at 1:00PM (IST) The show's anchors are  Smile Settai, and RJ Vigneshkanth.

Overview
The show features three or four guests and two anchors, the core idea is to get them to share their nostalgic memories besides funny and interesting moments. The guests are actors, musicians, newsreaders, TV stars, stunt masters, comedians, dancers and more. The show has five segments.

List of Episodes

References

External links
 

2017 Tamil-language television series debuts
2017 Tamil-language television series endings
Tamil-language talk shows
Tamil-language quiz shows
Tamil-language television shows
Zee Tamil original programming
Television shows set in Tamil Nadu